Eugen Berthold Friedrich Brecht (10 February 1898 – 14 August 1956), known professionally as Bertolt Brecht, was a German theatre practitioner, playwright, and poet. Coming of age during the Weimar Republic, he had his first successes as a playwright in Munich and moved to Berlin in 1924, where he wrote The Threepenny Opera with Kurt Weill and began a life-long collaboration with the composer Hanns Eisler.

During the Nazi Germany period, Brecht fled his home country, first to Scandinavia, and during World War II to the United States, where he was surveilled by the FBI. After the war he was subpoenaed by the House Un-American Activities Committee. Returning to East Berlin after the war, he established the theatre company Berliner Ensemble with his wife and long-time collaborator, actress Helene Weigel.

Life and career

Bavaria (1898–1924) 
Eugen Berthold Friedrich Brecht (as a child known as Eugen) was born on 10 February 1898 in Augsburg, Germany, the son of Berthold Friedrich Brecht (1869–1939) and his wife Sophie, née Brezing (1871–1920). Brecht's mother was a devout Protestant and his father a Roman Catholic (who had been persuaded to have a Protestant wedding). The modest house where he was born is today preserved as a Brecht Museum. His father worked for a paper mill, becoming its managing director in 1914. At Augsburg, his maternal grandparents lived in the neighbor house. They were Pietists and his grandmother influenced Bertolt Brecht and his brother Walter considerably during their childhood.

Due to his grandmother's and his mother's influence, Brecht knew the Bible, a familiarity that would have a life-long effect on his writing. From his mother came the "dangerous image of the self-denying woman" that recurs in his drama. Brecht's home life was comfortably middle class, despite what his occasional attempt to claim peasant origins implied. At school in Augsburg he met Caspar Neher, with whom he formed a life-long creative partnership. Neher designed many of the sets for Brecht's dramas and helped to forge the distinctive visual iconography of their epic theatre.

When Brecht was 16, World War I broke out. Initially enthusiastic, Brecht soon changed his mind on seeing his classmates "swallowed by the army". Brecht was nearly expelled from school in 1915 for writing an essay in response to the line Dulce et decorum est pro patria mori from the Roman poet Horace, calling it Zweckpropaganda ("cheap propaganda for a specific purpose") and arguing that only an empty-headed person could be persuaded to die for their country. His expulsion was only prevented by the intervention of Romuald Sauer, a priest who also served as a substitute teacher at Brecht's school.

On his father's recommendation, Brecht sought to avoid being conscripted into the army by exploiting a loophole which allowed for medical students to be deferred. He subsequently registered for a medical course at Munich University, where he enrolled in 1917. There he studied drama with Arthur Kutscher, who inspired in the young Brecht an admiration for the iconoclastic dramatist and cabaret star Frank Wedekind.

From July 1916, Brecht's newspaper articles began appearing under the new name "Bert Brecht" (his first theatre criticism for the Augsburger Volkswille appeared in October 1919). Brecht was drafted into military service in the autumn of 1918, only to be posted back to Augsburg as a medical orderly in a military VD clinic; the war ended a month later.

In July 1919, Brecht and Paula Banholzer (who had begun a relationship in 1917) had a son, Frank. In 1920 Brecht's mother died. Frank died in 1943, fighting for Nazi Germany on the Eastern Front.

Some time in either 1920 or 1921, Brecht took a small part in the political cabaret of the Munich comedian Karl Valentin. Brecht's diaries for the next few years record numerous visits to see Valentin perform. Brecht compared Valentin to Charlie Chaplin, for his "virtually complete rejection of mimicry and cheap psychology". Writing in his Messingkauf Dialogues years later, Brecht identified Valentin, along with Wedekind and Büchner, as his "chief influences" at that time:

Brecht's first full-length play, Baal (written 1918), arose in response to an argument in one of Kutscher's drama seminars, initiating a trend that persisted throughout his career of creative activity that was generated by a desire to counter another work (both others' and his own, as his many adaptations and re-writes attest). "Anyone can be creative," he quipped, "it's rewriting other people that's a challenge." Brecht completed his second major play, Drums in the Night, in February 1919.

Between November 1921 and April 1922 Brecht made acquaintance with many influential people in the Berlin cultural scene. Amongst them was the playwright Arnolt Bronnen with whom he established a joint venture, the Arnolt Bronnen / Bertolt Brecht Company. Brecht changed the spelling of his first name to Bertolt to rhyme with Arnolt.

In 1922 while still living in Munich, Brecht came to the attention of an influential Berlin critic, Herbert Ihering: "At 24 the writer Bert Brecht has changed Germany's literary complexion overnight"—he enthused in his review of Brecht's first play to be produced, Drums in the Night—"[he] has given our time a new tone, a new melody, a new vision. [...] It is a language you can feel on your tongue, in your gums, your ear, your spinal column." In November it was announced that Brecht had been awarded the prestigious Kleist Prize (intended for unestablished writers and probably Germany's most significant literary award, until it was abolished in 1932) for his first three plays (Baal, Drums in the Night, and In the Jungle, although at that point only Drums had been produced). The citation for the award insisted that: "[Brecht's] language is vivid without being deliberately poetic, symbolical without being over literary. Brecht is a dramatist because his language is felt physically and in the round." That year he married the Viennese opera singer Marianne Zoff. Their daughter, Hanne Hiob, born in March 1923, was a successful German actress.

In 1923, Brecht wrote a scenario for what was to become a short slapstick film, Mysteries of a Barbershop, directed by Erich Engel and starring Karl Valentin. Despite a lack of success at the time, its experimental inventiveness and the subsequent success of many of its contributors have meant that it is now considered one of the most important films in German film history. In May of that year, Brecht's In the Jungle premiered in Munich, also directed by Engel. Opening night proved to be a "scandal"—a phenomenon that would characterize many of his later productions during the Weimar Republic—in which Nazis blew whistles and threw stink bombs at the actors on the stage.

In 1924 Brecht worked with the novelist and playwright Lion Feuchtwanger (whom he had met in 1919) on an adaptation of Christopher Marlowe's Edward II that proved to be a milestone in Brecht's early theatrical and dramaturgical development. Brecht's Edward II constituted his first attempt at collaborative writing and was the first of many classic texts he was to adapt. As his first solo directorial début, he later credited it as the germ of his conception of "epic theatre". That September, a job as assistant dramaturg at Max Reinhardt's Deutsches Theater—at the time one of the leading three or four theatres in the world—brought him to Berlin.

Weimar Republic Berlin (1925–1933) 
In 1923 Brecht's marriage to Zoff began to break down (though they did not divorce until 1927). Brecht had become involved with both Elisabeth Hauptmann and Helene Weigel. Brecht and Weigel's son, Stefan, was born in October 1924.

In his role as dramaturg, Brecht had much to stimulate him but little work of his own. Reinhardt staged Shaw's Saint Joan, Goldoni's Servant of Two Masters (with the improvisational approach of the commedia dell'arte in which the actors chatted with the prompter about their roles), and Pirandello's Six Characters in Search of an Author in his group of Berlin theatres. A new version of Brecht's third play, now entitled Jungle: Decline of a Family, opened at the Deutsches Theater in October 1924, but was not a success.

At this time Brecht revised his important "transitional poem", "Of Poor BB". In 1925, his publishers provided him with Elisabeth Hauptmann as an assistant for the completion of his collection of poems, Devotions for the Home (Hauspostille, eventually published in January 1927). She continued to work with him after the publisher's commission ran out.

In 1925 in Mannheim the artistic exhibition Neue Sachlichkeit ("New Objectivity") had given its name to the new post-Expressionist movement in the German arts. With little to do at the Deutsches Theater, Brecht began to develop his Man Equals Man project, which was to become the first product of "the 'Brecht collective'—that shifting group of friends and collaborators on whom he henceforward depended." This collaborative approach to artistic production, together with aspects of Brecht's writing and style of theatrical production, mark Brecht's work from this period as part of the Neue Sachlichkeit movement. The collective's work "mirrored the artistic climate of the middle 1920s", Willett and Manheim argue:
with their attitude of Neue Sachlichkeit (or New Matter-of-Factness), their stressing of the collectivity and downplaying of the individual, and their new cult of Anglo-Saxon imagery and sport. Together the "collective" would go to fights, not only absorbing their terminology and ethos (which permeates Man Equals Man) but also drawing those conclusions for the theatre as a whole which Brecht set down in his theoretical essay "Emphasis on Sport" and tried to realise by means of the harsh lighting, the boxing-ring stage and other anti-illusionistic devices that henceforward appeared in his own productions.

In 1925, Brecht also saw two films that had a significant influence on him: Chaplin's The Gold Rush and Eisenstein's Battleship Potemkin. Brecht had compared Valentin to Chaplin, and the two of them provided models for Galy Gay in Man Equals Man. Brecht later wrote that Chaplin "would in many ways come closer to the epic than to the dramatic theatre's requirements." They met several times during Brecht's time in the United States, and discussed Chaplin's Monsieur Verdoux project, which it is possible Brecht influenced.

In 1926 a series of short stories was published under Brecht's name, though Hauptmann was closely associated with writing them. Following the production of Man Equals Man in Darmstadt that year, Brecht began studying Marxism and socialism in earnest, under the supervision of Hauptmann. "When I read Marx's Capital", a note by Brecht reveals, "I understood my plays." Marx was, it continues, "the only spectator for my plays I'd ever come across." Inspired by the developments in USSR, Brecht wrote a number of agitprop plays, praising the bolshevik collectivism (replaceability of each member of the collective in Man Equals Man) and the Red Terror (The Decision).

In 1927 Brecht became part of the "dramaturgical collective" of Erwin Piscator's first company, which was designed to tackle the problem of finding new plays for its "epic, political, confrontational, documentary theatre". Brecht collaborated with Piscator during the period of the latter's landmark productions, Hoppla, We're Alive! by Toller, Rasputin, The Adventures of the Good Soldier Schweik, and Konjunktur by Lania. Brecht's most significant contribution was to the adaptation of the unfinished episodic comic novel Schweik, which he later described as a "montage from the novel". The Piscator productions influenced Brecht's ideas about staging and design, and alerted him to the radical potentials offered to the "epic" playwright by the development of stage technology (particularly projections). What Brecht took from Piscator "is fairly plain, and he acknowledged it" Willett suggests:
The emphasis on Reason and didacticism, the sense that the new subject matter demanded a new dramatic form, the use of songs to interrupt and comment: all these are found in his notes and essays of the 1920s, and he bolstered them by citing such Piscatorial examples as the step-by-step narrative technique of Schweik and the oil interests handled in Konjunktur ('Petroleum resists the five-act form').
Brecht was struggling at the time with the question of how to dramatize the complex economic relationships of modern capitalism in his unfinished project Joe P. Fleischhacker (which Piscator's theatre announced in its programme for the 1927–28 season). It wasn't until his Saint Joan of the Stockyards (written between 1929–1931) that Brecht solved it. In 1928 he discussed with Piscator plans to stage Shakespeare's Julius Caesar and Brecht's own Drums in the Night, but the productions did not materialize.

The year 1927 also saw the first collaboration between Brecht and the young composer Kurt Weill. Together they began to develop Brecht's Mahagonny project, along thematic lines of the biblical Cities of the Plain but rendered in terms of the Neue Sachlichkeit'''s Amerikanismus, which had informed Brecht's previous work. They produced The Little Mahagonny for a music festival in July, as what Weill called a "stylistic exercise" in preparation for the large-scale piece. From that point on Caspar Neher became an integral part of the collaborative effort, with words, music and visuals conceived in relation to one another from the start. The model for their mutual articulation lay in Brecht's newly formulated principle of the "separation of the elements", which he first outlined in "The Modern Theatre Is the Epic Theatre" (1930). The principle, a variety of montage, proposed by-passing the "great struggle for supremacy between words, music and production" as Brecht put it, by showing each as self-contained, independent works of art that adopt attitudes towards one another.

In 1930 Brecht married Weigel; their daughter Barbara Brecht was born soon after the wedding. She also became an actress and would later share the copyrights of Brecht's work with her siblings.

Brecht formed a writing collective which became prolific and very influential. Elisabeth Hauptmann, Margarete Steffin, Emil Burri, Ruth Berlau and others worked with Brecht and produced the multiple teaching plays, which attempted to create a new dramaturgy for participants rather than passive audiences. These addressed themselves to the massive worker arts organisation that existed in Germany and Austria in the 1920s. So did Brecht's first great play, Saint Joan of the Stockyards, which attempts to portray the drama in financial transactions.

This collective adapted John Gay's The Beggar's Opera, with Brecht's lyrics set to music by Kurt Weill. Retitled The Threepenny Opera (Die Dreigroschenoper) it was the biggest hit in Berlin of the 1920s and a renewing influence on the musical worldwide. One of its most famous lines underscored the hypocrisy of conventional morality imposed by the Church, working in conjunction with the established order, in the face of working-class hunger and deprivation:

The success of The Threepenny Opera was followed by the quickly thrown together Happy End. It was a personal and a commercial failure. At the time the book was purported to be by the mysterious Dorothy Lane (now known to be Elisabeth Hauptmann, Brecht's secretary and close collaborator). Brecht only claimed authorship of the song texts. Brecht would later use elements of Happy End as the germ for his Saint Joan of the Stockyards, a play that would never see the stage in Brecht's lifetime. Happy Ends score by Weill produced many Brecht/Weill hits like "Der Bilbao-Song" and "Surabaya-Jonny".

The masterpiece of the Brecht/Weill collaborations, Rise and Fall of the City of Mahagonny (Aufstieg und Fall der Stadt Mahagonny), caused an uproar when it premiered in 1930 in Leipzig, with Nazis in the audience protesting. The Mahagonny opera would premier later in Berlin in 1931 as a triumphant sensation.

Brecht spent the last years of the Weimar-era (1930–1933) in Berlin working with his "collective" on the Lehrstücke. These were a group of plays driven by morals, music and Brecht's budding epic theatre. The Lehrstücke often aimed at educating workers on Socialist issues. The Measures Taken (Die Massnahme) was scored by Hanns Eisler. In addition, Brecht worked on a script for a semi-documentary feature film about the human impact of mass unemployment, Kuhle Wampe (1932), which was directed by Slatan Dudow. This striking film is notable for its subversive humour, outstanding cinematography by Günther Krampf, and Hanns Eisler's dynamic musical contribution. It still provides a vivid insight into Berlin during the last years of the Weimar Republic.

 Nazi Germany and World War II (1933–1945) 

Fearing persecution, Brecht left Nazi Germany in February 1933, just after Hitler took power. After brief spells in Prague, Zurich and Paris, he and Weigel accepted an invitation from journalist and author Karin Michaëlis to move to Denmark. The family first stayed with Karin Michaëlis at her house on the small island of Thurø close to the island of Funen. They later bought their own house in Svendborg on Funen. This house located at Skovsbo Strand 8 in Svendborg became the residence of the Brecht family for the next six years, where they often received guests including Walter Benjamin, Hanns Eisler and Ruth Berlau. During this period Brecht also travelled frequently to Copenhagen, Paris, Moscow, New York and London for various projects and collaborations.

When war seemed imminent in April 1939, he moved to Stockholm, Sweden, where he remained for a year. After Hitler invaded Norway and Denmark, Brecht left Sweden for Helsinki, Finland, where he lived and waited for his visa for the United States until 3 May 1941.

During the war years, Brecht became a prominent writer of the Exilliteratur. He expressed his opposition to the National Socialist and Fascist movements in his most famous plays: Life of Galileo, Mother Courage and Her Children, The Good Person of Szechwan, The Resistible Rise of Arturo Ui, The Caucasian Chalk Circle, Fear and Misery of the Third Reich, and many others.

Brecht co-wrote the screenplay for the Fritz Lang-directed film Hangmen Also Die! which was loosely based on the 1942 assassination of Reinhard Heydrich, the Nazi Deputy Reich Protector of the German-occupied Protectorate of Bohemia and Moravia, Heinrich Himmler's right-hand man in the SS, and a chief architect of the Holocaust, who was known as "The Hangman of Prague." Hanns Eisler was nominated for an Academy Award for his musical score. The collaboration of three prominent refugees from Nazi Germany – Lang, Brecht and Eisler – is an example of the influence this generation of German exiles had on American culture.

Hangmen Also Die! was Brecht's only script for a Hollywood film. The money he earned from writing the film enabled him to write The Visions of Simone Machard, Schweik in the Second World War and an adaptation of Webster's The Duchess of Malfi.

Brecht's reluctance to speak publicly in support of Carola Neher, who died in a gulag prison in the USSR after being arrested during the 1936 purges, was much criticised by Russian emigrants in the West.

 Cold War and final years in East Germany (1945–1956) 

In the years of the Cold War and "Red Scare", Brecht was blacklisted by movie studio bosses and interrogated by the House Un-American Activities Committee. Along with about 41 other Hollywood writers, directors, actors and producers, he was subpoenaed to appear before the HUAC in September 1947. Although he was one of 19 witnesses who declared that they would refuse to appear, Brecht eventually decided to testify. He later explained that he had followed the advice of attorneys and had not wanted to delay a planned trip to Europe. On 30 October 1947 Brecht testified that he had never been a member of the Communist Party. He made wry jokes throughout the proceedings, punctuating his inability to speak English well with continuous references to the translators present, who transformed his German statements into English ones unintelligible to himself. HUAC vice-chairman Karl Mundt thanked Brecht for his co-operation. The remaining witnesses, the so-called Hollywood Ten, refused to testify and were cited for contempt. Brecht's decision to appear before the committee led to criticism, including accusations of betrayal. The day after his testimony, on 31 October, Brecht returned to Europe. 

He lived in Zurich in Switzerland for a year. In February 1948 in Chur, Brecht staged an adaptation of Sophocles' Antigone, based on a translation by Hölderlin. It was published under the title Antigonemodell 1948, accompanied by an essay on the importance of creating a "non-Aristotelian" form of theatre.

In 1949 he moved to East Berlin and established his theatre company there, the Berliner Ensemble. He retained his Austrian nationality (granted in 1950) and overseas bank accounts from which he received valuable hard currency remittances. The copyrights on his writings were held by a Swiss company.

Though he was never a member of the Communist Party, Brecht had been schooled in Marxism by the dissident communist Karl Korsch. Korsch's version of the Marxist dialectic influenced Brecht greatly, both his aesthetic theory and theatrical practice. Brecht received the Stalin Peace Prize in 1954. His proximity to Marxist thought made him controversial in Austria, where his plays were boycotted by directors and not performed for more than ten years. 

Brecht wrote very few plays in his final years in East Berlin, none of them as famous as his previous works. He dedicated himself to directing plays and developing the talents of the next generation of young directors and dramaturgs, such as Manfred Wekwerth, Benno Besson and Carl Weber. At this time he wrote some of his most famous poems, including the "Buckow Elegies".

At first Brecht apparently supported the measures taken by the East German government against the uprising of 1953 in East Germany, which included the use of Soviet military force. In a letter from the day of the uprising to SED First Secretary Walter Ulbricht, Brecht wrote that: "History will pay its respects to the revolutionary impatience of the Socialist Unity Party of Germany. The great discussion [exchange] with the masses about the speed of socialist construction will lead to a viewing and safeguarding of the socialist achievements. At this moment I must assure you of my allegiance to the Socialist Unity Party of Germany."

Brecht's subsequent commentary on those events, however, offered a very different assessment—in one of the poems in the Elegies, "Die Lösung" (The Solution), a disillusioned Brecht writes a few months later:
After the uprising of the 17th of June
The Secretary of the Writers Union
Had leaflets distributed in the Stalinallee
Stating that the people
Had forfeited the confidence of the government
And could win it back only
By increased work quotas.

Would it not be easier
In that case for the government
To dissolve the people
And elect another?Brecht's involvement in agitprop and lack of clear condemnation of purges resulted in criticism from many contemporaries who became disillusioned with communism earlier. Fritz Raddatz who knew Brecht for a long time described his attitude as "broken", "escaping the problem of Stalinism", ignoring his friends being murdered in the USSR, keeping silence during show trials such as Slánský trial.

 Death 
Brecht died on 14 August 1956 of a heart attack at the age of 58. He is buried in the Dorotheenstadt Cemetery on Chausseestraße in the Mitte neighbourhood of Berlin, overlooked by the residence he shared with Helene Weigel.

According to Stephen Parker, who reviewed Brecht's writings and unpublished medical records, Brecht contracted rheumatic fever as a child, which led to an enlarged heart, followed by life-long chronic heart failure and Sydenham's chorea. A report of a radiograph taken of Brecht in 1951 describes a badly diseased heart, enlarged to the left with a protruding aortic knob and with seriously impaired pumping. Brecht's colleagues described him as being very nervous, and sometimes shaking his head or moving his hands erratically. This can be reasonably attributed to Sydenham's chorea, which is also associated with emotional lability, personality changes, obsessive-compulsive behavior, and hyperactivity, which matched Brecht's behavior. "What is remarkable," wrote Parker, "is his capacity to turn abject physical weakness into peerless artistic strength, arrhythmia into the rhythms of poetry, chorea into the choreography of drama."

 Theory and practice of theatre 

Brecht developed the combined theory and practice of his "Epic theatre" by synthesizing and extending the experiments of Erwin Piscator and Vsevolod Meyerhold to explore the theatre as a forum for political ideas and the creation of a critical aesthetics of dialectical materialism.

Epic Theatre proposed that a play should not cause the spectator to identify emotionally with the characters or action before him or her, but should instead provoke rational self-reflection and a critical view of the action on the stage. Brecht thought that the experience of a climactic catharsis of emotion left an audience complacent. Instead, he wanted his audiences to adopt a critical perspective in order to recognize social injustice and exploitation and to be moved to go forth from the theatre and effect change in the world outside. For this purpose, Brecht employed the use of techniques that remind the spectator that the play is a representation of reality and not reality itself. By highlighting the constructed nature of the theatrical event, Brecht hoped to communicate that the audience's reality was equally constructed, and as such, was changeable.

Brecht's modernist concern with drama-as-a-medium led to his refinement of the "epic form" of the drama. This dramatic form is related to similar modernist innovations in other arts, including the strategy of divergent chapters in James Joyce's novel Ulysses, Sergei Eisenstein's evolution of a constructivist "montage" in the cinema, and Picasso's introduction of cubist "collage" in the visual arts.

One of Brecht's most important principles was what he called the Verfremdungseffekt (translated as "defamiliarization effect", "distancing effect", or "estrangement effect", and often mistranslated as "alienation effect"). This involved, Brecht wrote, "stripping the event of its self-evident, familiar, obvious quality and creating a sense of astonishment and curiosity about them". To this end, Brecht employed techniques such as the actor's direct address to the audience, harsh and bright stage lighting, the use of songs to interrupt the action, explanatory placards, the transposition of text to the third person or past tense in rehearsals, and speaking the stage directions out loud.

In contrast to many other avant-garde approaches, however, Brecht had no desire to destroy art as an institution; rather, he hoped to "re-function" the theatre to a new social use. In this regard he was a vital participant in the aesthetic debates of his era—particularly over the "high art/popular culture" dichotomy—vying with the likes of Theodor W. Adorno, György Lukács, Ernst Bloch, and developing a close friendship with Walter Benjamin. Brechtian theatre articulated popular themes and forms with avant-garde formal experimentation to create a modernist realism that stood in sharp contrast both to its psychological and socialist varieties. "Brecht's work is the most important and original in European drama since Ibsen and Strindberg," Raymond Williams argues, while  dubs him "the most important materialist writer of our time."

Brecht was also influenced by Chinese theatre, and used its aesthetic as an argument for Verfremdungseffekt. Brecht believed, "Traditional Chinese acting also knows the alienation [sic] effect, and applies it most subtly. The [Chinese] performer portrays incidents of utmost passion, but without his delivery becoming heated." Brecht attended a Chinese opera performance and was introduced to the famous Chinese opera performer Mei Lanfang in 1935. However, Brecht was sure to distinguish between Epic and Chinese theatre. He recognized that the Chinese style was not a "transportable piece of technique", and that epic theatre sought to historicize and address social and political issues.

Brecht used his poetry to criticize European culture, including Nazis, and the German bourgeoisie. Brecht's poetry is marked by the effects of the First and Second World Wars.

Throughout his theatric production, poems are incorporated into this plays with music. In 1951, Brecht issued a recantation of his apparent suppression of poetry in his plays with a note titled On Poetry and Virtuosity. He writes:
We shall not need to speak of a play's poetry ... something that seemed relatively unimportant in the immediate past. It seemed not only unimportant, but misleading, and the reason was not that the poetic element had been sufficiently developed and observed, but that reality had been tampered with in its name ... we had to speak of a truth as distinct from poetry ... we have given up examining works of art from their poetic or artistic aspect, and got satisfaction from theatrical works that have no sort of poetic appeal ... Such works and performances may have some effect, but it can hardly be a profound one, not even politically. For it is a peculiarity of the theatrical medium that it communicates awarenesses and impulses in the form of pleasure: the depth of the pleasure and the impulse will correspond to the depth of the pleasure.
Brecht's most influential poetry is featured in his Manual of Piety (Devotions), establishing him as a noted poet.

 Legacy 
Brecht's widow, the actress Helene Weigel, continued to manage the Berliner Ensemble until her death in 1971; it was primarily devoted to performing Brecht's plays.

Besides being an influential dramatist and poet, some scholars have stressed the significance of Brecht's original contributions in political and social philosophy.

Brecht's collaborations with Kurt Weill have had some influence in rock music. The "Alabama Song" for example, originally published as a poem in Brecht's Hauspostille (1927) and set to music by Weill in Mahagonny, has been recorded by The Doors, on their self-titled debut album, as well as by David Bowie and various other bands and performers since the 1960s.

Brecht's son, Stefan Brecht, became a poet and theatre critic interested in New York's avant-garde theatre.

Brecht's plays were a focus of the Schauspiel Frankfurt when Harry Buckwitz was general manager, including the world premiere of Die Gesichte der Simone Machard in 1957.

 In fiction, drama, film, and music 
 In the 1930 novel Success, Brecht's mentor Lion Feuchtwanger immortalized Brecht as the character Kaspar Pröckl.
 In the Günter Grass play The Plebeians Rehearse the Uprising (1966), Brecht appears as "The Boss", rehearsing his version of Shakespeare's Coriolanus against the background of worker unrest in East Berlin in 1953.
 In 1969, Benjamin Britten's Children's Crusade was premiered, setting Brecht's narrative poem .
 Cuban songwriter Silvio Rodríguez started his song "Sueño con serpientes" from the album Días y flores (1975) with a phrase of Brecht.
 Brecht appears as a character in Christopher Hampton's play Tales from Hollywood, first produced in 1982, dealing with German expatriates in Hollywood at the time of the House Un-American Activities Committee hearings on supposed Communist infiltration of the motion picture industry and the beginning of the Hollywood blacklist.
 In Peter Weiss's monumental novel of 1981 Die Ästhetik des Widerstands (The Aesthetics of Resistance) Brecht is a teacher for the narrator who aspires to become a writer.
 In the 1999 film Cradle Will Rock Brecht appears as an inspiration to Marc Blitzstein.
 The 2000 German film Abschied – Brechts letzter Sommer (The Farewell), directed by Jan Schütte, depicts Brecht (Josef Bierbichler) shortly before his death, attended to by Helene Weigel (Monica Bleibtreu) and two former lovers.
 In the 2006 film The Lives of Others, a Stasi agent played by Ulrich Mühe is partially inspired to save a playwright he has been spying on by reading a book of Brecht poetry that he had stolen from the artist's apartment. In particular, the poem "Reminiscence of Marie A." is read.
 Brecht at Night by Mati Unt, transl. Eric Dickens (Dalkey Archive Press, 2009)
 In Robert Cohen's historical novel Exil der frechen Frauen (2009) Brecht is a major character.
 The 2013 film Witness 11 draws upon historical events exploring the justice-thirsty courtroom through the eyes of Brecht as he is called to testify in front of the House Un-American Activities Committee.
 In the 2013 Italian film Viva la libertà the Brecht poem To a Waverer forms the text for an important and moving speech.
 In the 2014 novel Leaving Berlin by Joseph Kanon, Brecht appears as a cynical returnee to Soviet Berlin, lauded by the authorities as a symbol of communist German culture and willing to ignore moral issues to pursue his art.
 The 2019 biopic Brecht deals with the author's life.

 Collaborators and associates 
Collective and collaborative working methods were inherent to Brecht's approach, as Fredric Jameson (among others) stresses. Jameson describes the creator of the work not as Brecht the individual, but rather as 'Brecht': a collective subject that "certainly seemed to have a distinctive style (the one we now call 'Brechtian') but was no longer personal in the bourgeois or individualistic sense." During the course of his career, Brecht sustained many long-lasting creative relationships with other writers, composers, scenographers, directors, dramaturgs and actors; the list includes: Elisabeth Hauptmann, Margarete Steffin, Ruth Berlau, Slatan Dudow, Kurt Weill, Hanns Eisler, Paul Dessau, Caspar Neher, Teo Otto, Karl von Appen, Ernst Busch, Lotte Lenya, Peter Lorre, Therese Giehse, Angelika Hurwicz, Carola Neher and Helene Weigel herself. This is "theatre as collective experiment [...] as something radically different from theatre as expression or as experience."

 List of collaborators and associates 

 Karl von Appen
 Walter Benjamin
 Eric Bentley
 Ruth Berghaus
 Ruth Berlau
 Berliner Ensemble
 Benno Besson
 Arnolt Bronnen
 Emil Burri
 Ernst Busch
 Paul Dessau
 Slatan Dudow
 Hanns Eisler
 Erich Engel
 Erwin Faber
 Lion Feuchtwanger
 Therese Giehse
 Alexander Granach
 Elisabeth Hauptmann
 John Heartfield
 Paul Hindemith
 Oskar Homolka
 Angelika Hurwicz
 Herbert Ihering
 Fritz Kortner
 Fritz Lang
 Wolfgang Langhoff
 Charles Laughton
 Lotte Lenya
 Theo Lingen
 Peter Lorre
 Joseph Losey
 Ralph Manheim
 Carola Neher
 Caspar Neher
 Teo Otto
 G. W. Pabst
 Erwin Piscator
 Margarete Steffin
 Carl Weber
 Helene Weigel
 Kurt Weill
 John Willett
 Hella Wuolijoki

 Works 

 Fiction 
 Stories of Mr. Keuner
 Threepenny Novel (Dreigroschenroman, 1934)
 The Business Affairs of Mr. Julius Caesar (1937–39, unfinished, published 1957)

 Plays and screenplays 
Entries show: English-language translation of title (German-language title) [year written] / [year first produced]

 Baal 1918/1923
 Drums in the Night (Trommeln in der Nacht) 1918–20/1922
 The Beggar (Der Bettler oder Der tote Hund) 1919/?
 A Respectable Wedding (Die Kleinbürgerhochzeit) 1919/1926
 Driving Out a Devil (Er treibt einen Teufel aus) 1919/?
 Lux in Tenebris 1919/?
 The Catch (Der Fischzug) 1919?/?
 Mysteries of a Barbershop (Mysterien eines Friseursalons) (screenplay) 1923
 In the Jungle of Cities (Im Dickicht der Städte) 1921–24/1923
 The Life of Edward II of England (Leben Eduards des Zweiten von England) 1924/1924
 Downfall of the Egotist Johann Fatzer (Der Untergang des Egoisten Johnann Fatzer) (fragments) 1926–30/1974
 Man Equals Man also A Man's A Man (Mann ist Mann) 1924–26/1926
 The Elephant Calf (Das Elefantenkalb) 1924–26/1926
 Little Mahagonny (Mahagonny-Songspiel) 1927/1927
 The Threepenny Opera (Die Dreigroschenoper) 1928/1928
 The Flight across the Ocean (Der Ozeanflug); originally Lindbergh's Flight (Lindberghflug) 1928–29/1929
 The Baden-Baden Lesson on Consent (Badener Lehrstück vom Einverständnis) 1929/1929
 Happy End (Happy End) 1929/1929
 The Rise and Fall of the City of Mahagonny (Aufstieg und Fall der Stadt Mahagonny) 1927–29/1930
 He Said Yes / He Said No (Der Jasager; Der Neinsager) 1929–30/1930–?
 The Decision/The Measures Taken (Die Maßnahme) 1930/1930
 Saint Joan of the Stockyards (Die heilige Johanna der Schlachthöfe) 1929–31/1959
 The Exception and the Rule (Die Ausnahme und die Regel) 1930/1938
 The Mother (Die Mutter) 1930–31/1932
 Kuhle Wampe (screenplay, with Ernst Ottwalt) 1931/1932
 The Seven Deadly Sins (Die sieben Todsünden der Kleinbürger) 1933/1933
 Round Heads and Pointed Heads (Die Rundköpfe und die Spitzköpfe) 1931–34/1936
 The Horatians and the Curiatians (Die Horatier und die Kuriatier) 1933–34/1958
 Fear and Misery of the Third Reich (Furcht und Elend des Dritten Reiches) 1935–38/1938
 Señora Carrar's Rifles (Die Gewehre der Frau Carrar) 1937/1937
 Life of Galileo (Leben des Galilei) 1937–39/1943
 How Much Is Your Iron? (Was kostet das Eisen?) 1939/1939
 Dansen (Dansen) 1939/?
 Mother Courage and Her Children (Mutter Courage und ihre Kinder) 1938–39/1941
 The Trial of Lucullus (Das Verhör des Lukullus) 1938–39/1940
 The Judith of Shimoda (Die Judith von Shimoda) 1940
 Mr Puntila and his Man Matti (Herr Puntila und sein Knecht Matti) 1940/1948
 The Good Person of Szechwan (Der gute Mensch von Sezuan) 1939–42/1943
 The Resistible Rise of Arturo Ui (Der aufhaltsame Aufstieg des Arturo Ui) 1941/1958
 Hangmen Also Die! (credited as Bert Brecht) (screenplay) 1942/1943
 The Visions of Simone Machard (Die Gesichte der Simone Machard) 1942–43/1957
 The Duchess of Malfi 1943/1943
 Schweik in the Second World War (Schweyk im Zweiten Weltkrieg) 1941–43/1957
 The Caucasian Chalk Circle (Der kaukasische Kreidekreis) 1943–45/1948
 Antigone (Die Antigone des Sophokles) 1947/1948
 The Days of the Commune (Die Tage der Commune) 1948–49/1956
 The Tutor (Der Hofmeister) 1950/1950
 The Condemnation of Lucullus (Die Verurteilung des Lukullus) 1938–39/1951
 Report from Herrnburg (Herrnburger Bericht) 1951/1951
 Coriolanus (Coriolan) 1951–53/1962
 The Trial of Joan of Arc at Rouen, 1431 (Der Prozess der Jeanne D'Arc zu Rouen, 1431) 1952/1952
 Turandot (Turandot oder Der Kongreß der Weißwäscher) 1953–54/1969
 Don Juan (Don Juan) 1952/1954
 Trumpets and Drums (Pauken und Trompeten) 1955/1955

 Theoretical works 
 The Modern Theatre Is the Epic Theatre (1930)
 The Threepenny Lawsuit (Der Dreigroschenprozess) (written 1931; published 1932)
 The Book of Changes (fragment also known as Me-Ti; written 1935–1939)
 The Street Scene (written 1938; published 1950)
 The Popular and the Realistic (written 1938; published 1958)
 Short Description of a New Technique of Acting which Produces an Alienation Effect (written 1940; published 1951)
 A Short Organum for the Theatre ("Kleines Organon für das Theater", written 1948; published 1949)
 The Messingkauf Dialogues (Dialoge aus dem Messingkauf, published 1963)

 Poetry 
Brecht wrote hundreds of poems throughout his life. He began writing poetry as a young boy, and his first poems were published in 1914. His poetry was influenced by folk-ballads, French chansons, and the poetry of Rimbaud and Villon. The last collection of new poetry by Brecht published in his lifetime was the 1939 Svendborger Gedichte.Some of Brecht's poems' 1940
 A Bad Time for Poetry
 Alabama Song
 Children's Crusade
 Children's Hymn
 Contemplating Hell
 From a German War Primer
 Germany
 Honored Murderer of the People
 How Fortunate the Man with None
 Hymn to Communism
 I Never Loved You More
 I want to Go with the One I Love
 I'm Not Saying Anything Against Alexander
 In Praise of Communism
 In Praise of Doubt
 In Praise of Illegal Work
 In Praise of Learning
 In Praise of Study
 In Praise of the Work of the Party
 Mack the Knife
 My Young Son Asks Me
 Not What Was Meant
 O Germany, Pale Mother!
 On Reading a Recent Greek Poet
 On the Critical Attitude
 Parting
  (Questions from a Worker Who Reads)
 Radio Poem
 Reminiscence of Marie A.
 Send Me a Leaf
 Solidarity Song
 The Book Burning (The Burning of the Books)
 The Exile of the Poets
 The Invincible Inscription
 The Mask of Evil
 The Sixteen-Year-Old Seamstress Emma Ries before the Magistrate
 The Solution
 To Be Read in the Morning and at Night
 To Posterity
 To the Students and Workers of the Peasants' Faculty
  (To Those Born After)
 United Front Song
 War Has Been Given a Bad Name
 What Has Happened?

 See also 

 Bertolt-Brecht-Literaturpreis
 Brecht Forum
List of refugees
 Weimar culture
 Western Marxism

 Notes 

 References 

 Primary sources 

 Essays, diaries, and journals 
 
 
 

 Drama, poetry, and prose 
 Brecht, Bertolt. 1994a. Collected Plays: One. Ed. John Willett and Ralph Manheim. Bertolt Brecht: Plays, Poetry, Prose Ser. London: Methuen. .
 1994b. Collected Plays: Two. Ed. John Willett and Ralph Manheim. London: Methuen. .
 1997. Collected Plays: Three. Ed. John Willett. London: Methuen. .
 2003b. Collected Plays: Four. Ed. Tom Kuhn and John Willett. London: Methuen. .
 1995. Collected Plays: Five. Ed. John Willett and Ralph Manheim. London: Methuen. .
 1994c. Collected Plays: Six. Ed. John Willett and Ralph Manheim. London: Methuen. .
 1994d. Collected Plays: Seven. Ed. John Willett and Ralph Manheim. London: Methuen. .
 2004. Collected Plays: Eight. Ed. Tom Kuhn and David Constantine. London: Methuen. .
 1972. Collected Plays: Nine. Ed. John Willett and Ralph Manheim. New York: Vintage. .
 2000b. Poems: 1913–1956. Ed. John Willett and Ralph Manheim. London: Methuen. .
 1983. Short Stories: 1921–1946. Ed. John Willett and Ralph Manheim. Trans. Yvonne Kapp, Hugh Rorrison and Antony Tatlow. London and New York: Methuen. .
 2001. Stories of Mr. Keuner. Trans. Martin Chalmers. San Francisco: City Lights. .

 Secondary sources 

 
 
 
 
 
 
 
 
 
 
 
 
 
 
 
 
 
 
  Translation of : Bertolt Brecht, Eine Biographie. Munich and Vienna: Carl Hanser Verlag. .
 
 
 
 
 
 

Further reading

 [Anon.] 1952. "Brecht Directs". In Directors on Directing: A Source Book to the Modern Theater. Ed. Toby Cole and Helen Krich Chinoy. Rev. ed. Boston, MA: Allyn & Bacon, 1963. . 291- [Account of Brecht in rehearsal from anonymous colleague published in Theaterarbeit]
 
 
 Demčišák, Ján. 2012. "Queer Reading von Brechts Frühwerk". Marburg: Tectum Verlag. .
 Demetz, Peter, ed. 1962. "From the Testimony of Berthold Brecht: Hearings of the House Committee on Un-American Activities, 30 October 1947". Brecht: A Collection of Critical Essays. Twentieth Century Views Ser. Eaglewood Cliffs, New Jersey: Prentice Hall. . 30–42.
 Diamond, Elin. 1997. Unmaking Mimesis: Essays on Feminism and Theater. London and New York: Routledge. .
 Eagleton, Terry. 1985. "Brecht and Rhetoric". New Literary History 16.3 (Spring). 633–638.
 Eaton, Katherine B. "Brecht's Contacts with the Theater of Meyerhold". in Comparative Drama 11.1 (Spring 1977)3–21. Reprinted in 1984. Drama in the Twentieth Century ed. C. Davidson. New York: AMS Press, 1984. . 203–221. 1979. "Die Pionierin und Feld-Herren vorm Kreidekreis. Bemerkungen zu Brecht und Tretjakow". in Brecht-Jahrbuch 1979. Ed. J. Fuegi, R. Grimm, J. Hermand. Suhrkamp, 1979. 1985 19–29. The Theater of Meyerhold and Brecht. Connecticut and New York: Greenwood Press. .
 Eddershaw, Margaret. 1982. "Acting Methods: Brecht and Stanislavski". In Brecht in Perspective. Ed. Graham Bartram and Anthony Waine. London: Longman. . 128–144.
 Esslin, Martin. 1960. Brecht: The Man and His Work. New York: Doubleday. , first published in 1959 as Brecht: A Choice of Evils. London: Eyre & Spottiswoode.
 Fuegi, John. 1994. "The Zelda Syndrome: Brecht and Elizabeth Hauptmann". In Thomson and Sacks (1994, 104–116).
 Fuegi, John. 2002. Brecht and Company: Sex, Politics, and the Making of the Modern Drama. New York: Grove. .
 Giles, Steve. 1998. "Marxist Aesthetics and Cultural Modernity in Der Dreigroschenprozeß". Bertolt Brecht: Centenary Essays. Ed. Steve Giles and Rodney Livingstone. German Monitor 41. Amsterdam and Atlanta, Georgia: Rodopi. . 49–61.
 Giles, Steve. 1997. Bertolt Brecht and Critical Theory: Marxism, Modernity and the Threepenny Lawsuit. Bern: Lang. .
 Glahn, Philip, 2014. Bertolt Brecht. London: Reaktion Books. .
 Jacobs, Nicholas and Prudence Ohlsen, eds. 1977. Bertolt Brecht in Britain. London: IRAT Services Ltd and TQ Publications. .
 Katz, Pamela. 2015. The Partnership: Brecht, Weill, Three Women, and Germany on the Brink. New York: Nan A. Talese/Doubleday. .
 Krause, Duane. 1995. "An Epic System". In Acting (Re)considered: Theories and Practices. Ed. Phillip B. Zarrilli. 1st ed. Worlds of Performance Ser. London: Routledge. . 262–274.
 Leach, Robert. 1994. "Mother Courage and Her Children". In .
 Giuseppe Leone, "Bertolt Brecht, ripropose l'eterno conflitto dell'intellettuale fra libertà di ricerca e condizionamenti del potere", su "Ricorditi...di me" in "Lecco 2000", Lecco, June 1998.
 McBride, Patrizia. "De-Moralizing Politics: Brecht's Early Aesthetics." Deutsche Vierteljahrsschrift für Literaturwissenschaft und Geistesgeschichte 82.1 (2008): 85–111.
 Milfull, John. 1974. From Baal to Keuner. The "Second Optimism" of Bertolt Brecht, Bern and Frankfurt am Main: Peter Lang.
 Mitter, Schomit. 1992. "To Be And Not To Be: Bertolt Brecht and Peter Brook". Systems of Rehearsal: Stanislavsky, Brecht, Grotowski and Brook. London: Routledge. . 42–77.
 Müller, Heiner. 1990. Germania. Trans. Bernard Schütze and Caroline Schütze. Ed. Sylvère Lotringer. Semiotext(e) Foreign Agents Ser. New York: Semiotext(e). .
 Needle, Jan and Peter Thomson. 1981. Brecht. Chicago: University of Chicago Press; Oxford: Basil Blackwell. .
 Pabst, G. W. 1984. The Threepenny Opera. Classic Film Scripts Series. London: Lorrimer. .
 Parker, Stephen. 2014. Bertolt Brecht: A Literary Life. London: Methuen Drama. .
 Reinelt, Janelle. 1990. "Rethinking Brecht: Deconstruction, Feminism, and the Politics of Form". The Brecht Yearbook 15. Ed. Marc Silberman et al. Madison, Wisconsin: The International Brecht Society, University of Wisconsin Press. 99–107.
 Reinelt, Janelle. 1994. "A Feminist Reconsideration of the Brecht/Lukács Debate". Women & Performance: A Journal of Feminist Theory 7.1 (issue 13). 122–139.
 Rouse, John. 1995. "Brecht and the Contradictory Actor". In Acting (Re)considered: A Theoretical and Practical Guide. Ed. Phillip B. Zarrilli. 2nd ed. Worlds of Performance Series. London: Routledge. . 248–259.
 
 
 Sternberg, Fritz. 1963. Der Dichter und die Ratio: Erinnerungen an Bertolt Brecht. Göttingen: Sachse & Pohl.
 Szondi, Péter. 1965. Theory of the Modern Drama. Ed. and trans. Michael Hays. Theory and History of Literature Series. 29. Minneapolis: University of Minnesota Press, 1987. .
 Taxidou, Olga. 2007. Modernism and Performance: Jarry to Brecht. Basingstoke, Hampshire: Palgrave Macmillan. .
 Thomson, Peter. 2000. "Brecht and Actor Training: On Whose Behalf Do We Act?" In Twentieth Century Actor Training. Ed. Alison Hodge. London and New York: Routledge. . 98–112.
 Weber, Carl. 1984. "The Actor and Brecht, or: The Truth Is Concrete: Some Notes on Directing Brecht with American Actors". The Brecht Yearbook 13: 63–74.
 Weber, Carl. 1994. "Brecht and the Berliner Ensemble – the Making of a Model". In Thomson and Sacks (1994, 167–184).
 
 Witt, Hubert, ed. 1975. Brecht As They Knew Him. Trans. John Peet. London: Lawrence and Wishart; New York: International Publishers. .
 Wizisla, Erdmut. 2009. Walter Benjamin and Bertolt Brecht: The Story of a Friendship. Translated by Christine Shuttleworth. London / New Haven: Libris / Yale University Press.  [Contains a complete translation of the newly discovered minutes of the meetings around the putative journal Krise und Kritik (1931)].
 Womack, Peter (1979), "Brecht: The Search for an Audience", in Bold, Christine (ed.), Cencrastus, no. 1, Autumn 1979, pp. 24–28, 
 Youngkin, Stephen D. 2005. The Lost One: A Life of Peter Lorre''. University Press of Kentucky. . [Contains a detailed discussion of the personal and professional friendship between Brecht and film actor Peter Lorre.]

External links 

 
 "Brecht's Works in English: A Bibliography", University of Wisconsin–Madison Libraries
 "The Brecht Yearbook", University of Wisconsin–Madison Libraries
 "Communications from the International Brecht Society (1971–2014)", University of Wisconsin–Madison Libraries
 International Brecht Society records, University of Maryland Libraries
 FBI files on Bertolt Brecht
 A history of Mack the Knife by Joseph Mach at Brechthall
 

 
1898 births
1956 deaths
Writers from Augsburg
People from the Kingdom of Bavaria
People from Svendborg
Acting theorists
East German writers
German male poets
East German poets
German literary critics
Protestants in the German Resistance
German theatre critics
German theatre directors
Hollywood blacklist
Kleist Prize winners
Marxist theorists
German Marxist writers
Modernist theatre
German opera librettists
Exilliteratur writers
Stalin Peace Prize recipients
Theatre practitioners
German male dramatists and playwrights
20th-century German dramatists and playwrights
20th-century German screenwriters
German male screenwriters